Shadows is a British supernatural television anthology series produced by Thames Television for ITV between 1975 and 1978. Extending over three series, it featured ghost and horror dramas for children.

Notable writers for the series included J. B. Priestley, Fay Weldon, PJ Hammond, Joan Aiken, Jacquetta Hawkes and Penelope Lively.

Cast
Guest actors included John Nettleton, Gareth Thomas, Jenny Agutter, Pauline Quirke, Brian Glover, June Brown, Rachel Herbert, Jacqueline Pearce and Gwyneth Strong.

The series was also notable for reviving the character of Mr. Stabs (Russell Hunter) from the TV series Ace of Wands.

Episodes

Series 1 (1975)

Series 2 (1976)

Series 3 (1978)

Awards
In 1976 and 1977 Shadows was nominated for the Harlequin BAFTA TV Award under the category of Drama/Light Entertainment. The series missed out on winning on both occasions, to Ballet Shoes and The Multi-Coloured Swap Shop respectively.

Spin-offs

A 1979 TV series, The Boy Merlin, was based on the third series episode of the same name.

Home media
"Shadows: The Complete First Series" was released on DVD in the UK on 1 November 2010 by Network, with the sixth episode Dutch Schlitz's Shoes being included on the Ace of Wands DVD boxset as an extra due to it featuring the Mr. Stabs character. Series 2 was released in June 2011.

In other media

Books
A tie-in book, The Best Of Shadows was released by Corgi in 1979. It featured adaptations of seven episodes: The Dark Streets of Kimball's Green, The Inheritance, Eleven O'Clock, And Now For My Next Trick, The Rose of Puddle Fratrum, The Eye and The Man Who Hated Children.

References

External links
 
 
Encyclopedia of Fantastic Film and TV: Shadows
The Haunted Television website: Shadows

British supernatural television shows
ITV children's television shows
1970s British children's television series
1975 British television series debuts
1978 British television series endings
English-language television shows
Television shows produced by Thames Television
Television series by Fremantle (company)
British fantasy television series